Pierre de Saint-Joseph (born Pierre Comagère; ; 1594 – 1662), was a French Cistercian monk, philosopher, and theologian.

Works

References

1594 births
1662 deaths
French Cistercians
17th-century French philosophers
17th-century French Catholic theologians